Dedaye Township is a township of Pyapon District in the Ayeyarwady Region of Myanmar.

Townships of Ayeyarwady Region